Luge at the 1964 Winter Olympics consisted of three events at Olympic Sliding Centre Innsbruck.  The competition took place between 30 January and 4 February 1964.

This was the first appearance of Luge in the Winter Olympics. It was originally scheduled to be added in 1960, but as there was no venue built for it in Squaw Valley, the sport's debut came in 1964.

Medal summary

Medal table

Germany won five of the nine medals available, including two gold medals.

Events

Participating NOCs
Twelve nations participated in Luge at the Innsbruck Games.

References

 
1964
1964 Winter Olympics events
1964 in luge